Bruno Martins Grou (born 25 December 1990) is a Portuguese footballer who plays for Pinhalnovense as a midfielder.

Football career
On 15 August 2013, Grou made his professional debut with Académico de Viseu in a 2013–14 Segunda Liga match against Braga B.

References

External links

Stats and profile at LPFP 

1990 births
Sportspeople from Guimarães
Living people
Portuguese footballers
Association football midfielders
C.D. Pinhalnovense players
Sertanense F.C. players
G.D. Fabril players
Académico de Viseu F.C. players
Liga Portugal 2 players